Szeptycki (feminine:Szeptycka) is a Polish-language surname. It belongs to the Polish noble Szeptycki family. The Ukrainian-language spelling of the surname is Sheptytsky (Sheptytskyi) / Sheptytska.

Notable people with the surname include:

Andrey Sheptytsky (1865-1944), Metropolitan Archbishop of the Ukrainian Greek Catholic Church
Athanasius Szeptycki (1686-1746),  bishop of the Ruthenian Uniate Church, Metropolitan bishop of Kiev, Galicia and all Ruthenia.
Jadwiga Szeptycka (1883-1939), Polish archeologist and ethnographer, writer and social activist
Klymentiy Sheptytsky (1869-1951),  archimandrite of the  Ukrainian Greek Catholic Church
Leo Szeptycki (1717-1779),  bishop of the Ruthenian Uniate Church, Metropolitan bishop of Kiev, Galicia and all Ruthenia.
Oleh Sheptytskyi (born 1986), Ukrainian footballer
Stanisław Szeptycki (1867-1950), Polish general and minister
Zofia Szeptycka (1837- 1904), Polish countess, poet and painter

See also